Dart is a surname. Notable people with the surname include:

Doc Corbin Dart (born 1953), American punk rock singer
G. F. J. Dart (1905–1978), New Zealand educational reformer and scholar
Harriet Dart (born 1996), British professional tennis player
Harry Grant Dart (1869–1938), American cartoonist and illustrator
Jaxson Dart (born 2003), American football player
Justin Whitlock Dart Sr. (1907–1984), American entrepreneur
Justin Whitlock Dart Jr. (1930–2002), American disability activist
Kenneth Dart (born 1955), American businessman and billionaire
Leslee Dart, American publicist and entrepreneur
Raymond Dart (1893–1988), Australian anatomist and anthropologist
Rollin Dart (1925–2016), American banker
Tom Dart (born 1962), American lawyer and politician, and sheriff of Cook County, Illinois
Thurston Dart (1921–1971), British musicologist
William A. Dart (1814–1890), American lawyer and politician
Yoshiko Dart, disability rights activist
Joe Dart (born 1991), bassist of funk band Vulfpeck